Chris Downey is an American writer and producer.

Downey got his start as a television writer with an episode of Cosby in 1998.  He went on to write for several other shows, including Oh, Grow Up, and What about Joan, and later to produce other shows, including The King of Queens and Leverage.

Early life
Chris Downey was born in New York City and lived with his parents.  Before working in television, Downey went to law school and wrote for his school's newspaper.

Career
Downey was a co-creator, writer and an executive producer of the TV show, Leverage, which ran for five seasons from 2008–2012 on TNT. Downey stated that he feels the biggest challenge with the show is constantly having to come up with new challenges and cons for the crew, as he felt they had done so many already.

Podcast
For five months, between November 2012 and March 2013, Downey produced and hosted a weekly podcast, The Downey Files, at his personal website and on iTunes.  Each episode featured Downey and a guest tackling a half-baked movie idea and developing it in full within a half-hour.  Guests have included Wil Wheaton, John Rogers, Christine Boylan, Eric Heissner, Michael Colton, and John Aboud.

Filmography

Writer

References

External links
 

Living people
American film producers
American male screenwriters
American television producers
American television writers
American male television writers
Year of birth missing (living people)